Harold Edwin Clamp (14 September 1934 – 14 December 1995) was an English footballer who played in the Football League for Arsenal, Peterborough United, Stoke City and Wolverhampton Wanderers. Through his career he was renowned for his 'take no prisoners' style of play and was nicknamed 'Chopper Eddie'.

Career
Clamp joined Wolverhampton Wanderers in 1950, turning professional in April 1952, before breaking into the first team to make his debut on 6 March 1954, away at Manchester United. He made one further appearance that season as he club won their first league title. He later became an integral part of the first team and won League Championships in (1957–58 and 1958–59) and the 1960 FA Cup. He played over 200 matches for Wolves before signing for Arsenal for £34,000 in November 1961. The last signing made by George Swindin, he made his debut against Nottingham Forest on 18 November 1961 but stayed only ten months. His tough tackling style had failed to find favour with his former teammate, now Arsenal manager, Billy Wright, and so he was sold to Stoke City in September 1962 for £35,000.

At Stoke, he won the Second Division title in 1962–63, playing alongside Stanley Matthews. After Ron "Chopper" Harris had poleaxed Matthews in one game Clamp threatened Harris, only to be admonished by the referee, an angry Clamp said "Thats the trouble with you referees. You don't care which side wins!" Matthews said in his autobiography that this was one of the greatest lines ever said on a football pitch. He was described as 'mad' by Stoke trainer Frank Mountford and on more than one occasion he would headbutt an opponent whilst the referee's attention was diverted. He played 28 times for the "Potters" in 1963–64 helping Stoke to reach the League Cup final. But with Clamp again suspended Stoke lost 4–3 over two legs.

He finished his league career at Peterborough United, before dropping into the non-league with Worcester City and Lower Gornal. He retired from football in 1969 to run a building and decorating business in Wednesfield and later became a bricklayer. Clamp also played four times for the England national football team, including three matches in the 1958 FIFA World Cup, after making his debut just before the tournament in a friendly draw in Russia on 18 May before 102,000 spectators.

His mother, Sarah, was Wolverhampton Wanderers' laundry lady for some 30 years beginning in the 1950s before retiring in the 1980s. She outlived her son by 11 years, dying in November 2006 at the age of 94.

Career statistics

Club
Source:

A.  The "Other" column constitutes appearances and goals in the FA Charity Shield and European Cup.

International
Source:

Honours
Wolverhampton Wanderers
FA Youth Cup runners-up: 1953
Football League First Division: 1957–58, 1958–59
FA Cup: 1960
Stoke City
Football League Second Division: 1962–63

References

1934 births
1995 deaths
English footballers
England international footballers
Wolverhampton Wanderers F.C. players
Arsenal F.C. players
Stoke City F.C. players
Peterborough United F.C. players
Worcester City F.C. players
1958 FIFA World Cup players
English Football League players
People from Coalville
Footballers from Leicestershire
People from Wednesfield
English Football League representative players
Association football midfielders
FA Cup Final players